M. Joan Alexander is an atmospheric scientist known for her research on gravity waves and their role in atmospheric circulation.

Education and career 
Alexander earned a B.S. in Chemistry from Purdue University in 1981 and a M.S. in Astrophysical, Planetary & Atmospheric Sciences from University of Colorado, Boulder in 1989. She then completed her Ph.D. in Astrophysical, Planetary & Atmospheric Sciences in 1992 from the University of Colorado, Boulder.

Following her Ph.D., Alexander worked at Hughes Aircraft Company, Great Lakes Chemical Company, Martin Marietta Aerospace Corporation before moving to the University of Colorado, Boulder as a Research Assistant in 1987. In 1992 she moved to the University of Washington, first as postdoctoral faculty (1992-1994) and then as a research assistant professor. In 1998 she joined NorthWest Research Associates where she is a senior research scientist; she also holds the position of Professor Adjoint at the University of Colorado, Boulder.

From 2004 to 2006, Alexander was the president of the Atmospheric Sciences section of the American Geophysical Union.

Research 
Alexander's research interests include atmospheric dynamics, waves, convection, global circulation modeling, mesoscale modeling, satellite, aircraft, balloon-borne observations, and middle atmosphere studies. Alexander's early research examined changes in atomic oxygen in the atmospheres of Venus  and Mars. Following this period, she began examining waves in the atmosphere such as high-frequency gravity waves formed during storms. She also established the conditions to adequately characterize gravity waves in the stratosphere, how to parameterize gravity waves in climate models, and how satellite imagery can be used to track atmospheric gravity waves. Through this research, Alexander is able to link gravity waves with climate modeling and modeling of storms.

Alexander's research uses high altitude balloons that circle the globe in the stratosphere and collect data on the air and winds. In 2020, Alexander received funding from the National Science Foundation to use data from balloons being launched by Loon LLC to provide internet service; the high resolution data from the balloons will allow Alexander and colleagues to track gravity waves in the atmosphere and use the resulting data to improve weather and climate models.

Selected publications

Awards 
 Bjerknes Lecturer, American Geophysical Union (2000)
 Fellow, American Meteorological Society (2006)
 Fellow, American Geophysical Union (2017)

References

External links 
 
 

Fellows of the American Geophysical Union
Fellows of the American Meteorological Society
University of Colorado Boulder alumni
Purdue University alumni
University of Colorado Boulder faculty
Women atmospheric scientists
Year of birth missing (living people)
Living people